Emil Ramil oğlu Mustafayev (born 24 September 2001) is a Ukrainian-born Azеrbaijani professional football midfielder who plays for Oleksandriya.

Career
Mustafayev is a product of the different youth sportive school systems from Kirovohrad Oblast and was playing a football from age 5 years old.

He also played a one season in a futsal FC Tarasivka and in August 2018 Mustafayev signed a deal with the Ukrainian Premier League club FC Oleksandriya and made his debut in the Ukrainian Premier League on 9 May 2021, playing as the second half-time substituted player in an away losing match against FC Zorya Luhansk.

International career
Mustafayev was born in Ukraine, but because he is of Azerbaijani descent, was called up to the Azerbaijan national under-21 football team in November 2021.

References

External links 
 
 

2001 births
Living people
Citizens of Azerbaijan through descent
Azerbaijani footballers
Ukrainian footballers
Azerbaijani people of Ukrainian descent
Ukrainian people of Azerbaijani descent
FC Oleksandriya players
Ukrainian Premier League players
Association football midfielders
Azerbaijan under-21 international footballers
Ukrainian men's futsal players